Hallie Kate Eisenberg (born August 2, 1992) is an American former child actress, best known for being "The Pepsi Girl" in a series of Pepsi commercials, as Marie Alweather in Paulie, and her role as Erika Tansy in How to Eat Fried Worms.

Early life
Eisenberg was born in New Brunswick, New Jersey, the daughter of Amy and Barry Eisenberg, who ran a hospital and later became a college professor. She has two siblings: actor Jesse Eisenberg, the Academy Award-nominated star of The Social Network, and Kerry. Hallie was named after the character Hallie O'Fallon in the film All I Want for Christmas, portrayed by Thora Birch. Eisenberg attended American University, in Washington, DC. She was brought up in a secular Jewish family.

Career
In the late 1990s and early 2000s, she was "The Pepsi Girl" in a series of Pepsi commercials. She made her film debut in the children's film Paulie, playing the young owner of the title parrot. After appearing in a few made-for-television films, she had supporting parts in 1999's The Insider and Bicentennial Man.

In 2000, Eisenberg co-starred with Minnie Driver in the feature film Beautiful, which received generally negative reviews. She also starred as Helen Keller in a television remake of The Miracle Worker.

In 2004, she played opposite Jeff Daniels and Patricia Heaton in the television remake of The Goodbye Girl. In 2006, Eisenberg appeared in How to Eat Fried Worms, the New Line Cinema adaptation of Thomas Rockwell's book of the same name. In 2007, she co starred in the independent feature film P.J. alongside John Heard, Vincent Pastore and Robert Picardo.

Eisenberg made her Broadway debut in Roundabout Theatre's production of Clare Boothe Luce's play The Women. In 2010, she halted her film career to attend college.

Filmography

References

External links
 
 
 Hallie Kate Eisenberg's biography on filmbug

1992 births
20th-century American actresses
21st-century American actresses
American child actresses
American film actresses
Actresses from New Jersey
American television actresses
American University alumni
Jewish American actresses
Living people
People from East Brunswick, New Jersey
21st-century American Jews